The Gamers: Dorkness Rising is a feature-length film produced by Dead Gentlemen Productions, and focuses on a group of table-top role-playing gamers as their gamemaster attempts to shepherd them through a campaign that they've played through three times and have yet to actually finish. While the film is set in the same universe as and has a similar theme to its predecessor, The Gamers, it is not a direct sequel to the first film, as it focuses on a different group of players. Also, unlike its predecessor, this film dedicates a substantial portion of the film to the players themselves, and not their characters. It began filming in 2005 and was set for release in 2006, and was finally released at Gen Con in Indianapolis by Anthem Pictures on August 14, 2008. Paizo had an exclusive sales window for the 2008 Gen Con convention where the cast and crew of The Gamers: Dorkness Rising were signing copies at the Paizo booth.

Plot

The film opens with a live action scene of three Dungeons & Dragons characters facing the final villain. However, they are quickly killed and after blaming each other, the players (Cass, Leo, and Gary) blame the game master, Lodge, claiming he did not follow the rules and plotted against them. While Leo and Gary wish to play a different game the following week, Cass demands to play the same campaign again, even though they just played it and lost for the second time, to preserve his reputation that there is no game he cannot win. Lodge wishes to publish his campaign as an official Dungeons & Dragons game module, but he is having trouble writing it: he knows how he wants it to end, but his players never actually finish the module. Gary suggests that for the next game they bring in two more players, in order to have a more well-rounded party. Cass is able to recruit his ex-girlfriend Joanna, and quickly reveals why they split: Cass is overbearing and condescending, belittling Joanna's character design strategy (she chose several abilities that normally wouldn't be useful to her character). The group has otherwise acquired an unfavorable reputation, and Lodge is unable to find anyone else, despite asking fifteen regular gamers.

The campaign begins when the characters Luster (Gary), Flynn the Fine (Leo), and Daphne (Joanna) are summoned before King Erasmus the Randomly Biased. The evil necromancer Mort Kemnon has discovered an artifact known as the Mask of Death and wishes to use this to overthrow the kingdom. As they go on their way, where Luster kills a random NPC while Daphne attempts to roleplay, they are summoned before the Hierophant of the Grand Illuminated Holy Order of Therin who sends two members of his order to accompany the party, Brother Silence (Cass) and Sir Osric (Lodge) -- the latter of whom the other players (with the exception of Joanna) take an instant dislike to, as Lodge created Osric just to keep the story on track. On their way, the group runs into a large party of goblins. The group (and Cass in particular) are surprised and embarrassed when Joanna's allegedly 'poorly designed' character single-handedly defeats the entire goblin party; Leo's bard is killed three times, however, which becomes a running joke throughout the remainder of the film.

Resting at an inn near Westhaven, the group faces and defeats Mort Agrippa. They head out for Westhaven and decide to stop playing for the night. Lodge explains to Joanna the reasons why he keeps the other players on such a short leash: if he does not, they will kill, plunder, and impregnate the fantasy world. The following week, the players continue the campaign by facing Drazuul in the town of Westhaven. Due to his character's weak traits, Leo goes through multiple copies of the character until the players are able to cleverly defeat Drazuul by hiding behind "the mound of dead bards". Torturing Drazuul with holy water, they learn of Mort Kemnon's location.

Making their way through an abandoned mineshaft, they find a henchman from the previous campaign and recover their previous party's equipment. The battle goes poorly for the players, until Lodge's cat messes up the floor-tiles and Cass distracts Lodge while they place their characters in preferable positions. After a lengthy battle with Kemnon (with Silence using a lightsaber, shotgun, chainsaw, and dynamite which he claimed to have "found" in the trunk), Kemnon is defeated and cryptically implies there is another enemy. It is revealed to be the Hierophant, who intends to use the Mask to rekindle the Light of Therin. The group then realizes that the "Heart of Therin", the church's most sacred relic, is actually a prison housing the deity. During a battle with the Hierophant, Leo finally proves to be of use as he awakens Therin from her prison, allowing Daphne to release her (though Osric is killed in the encounter).

Afterwards, Daphne is offered an unlimited wish by Therin. After the other players recommend she wishes herself immortal, she uses it to resurrect Osric, much to the extreme disapproval of Cass, who insults her and storms out. The other three continue playing, and Therin provides rewards for each: Flynn becomes a herald, Luster is stripped of her powers and becomes a cleric, and Osric becomes Lord High Marshal of the Paladins. The campaign ends, and with positive comments from Gary and Leo, Lodge is inspired enough to write his module and has it published. Sometime later, Cass apologizes for his behavior and the group begins another adventure. Lodge wants to send his group through the adventure module that another group was playing in the first Gamers film, but upon mentioning 'The Shadow', Mark—the lone survivor of that campaign—screams in fear and runs from the gaming store. As the new campaign begins with the Mask of Death having been stolen, the film ends showing the henchman still alone in the mine.

Characters

Nathan Rice as Kevin Lodge/Sir Osric the Chaste — The Game Master and leader of the quest. Lodge believes in story over rules, and is often at odds with the player Cass. Rice previously appeared as a different character in the first Gamers film.
Carol Roscoe as Joanna Harcourt/Daphne — The new player who cares more about the story than levels. She is portrayed as the token female player and is at first not taken seriously by the other gamers.  She plays a fighter.
Brian S. Lewis as Sean "Cass" Cassidy/Brother Silence — Joanna's ex and an arrogant obsessed gamer who plays a monk. He plays with a by-the-rules attitude (rules lawyer) and prefers a hack and slash style of gameplay.
Christian Doyle/Jennifer Page as Gary Wombaugh/Luster — A male who plays a powerful female sorceress who destroys NPCs (especially peasants). Jennifer Page plays the female Luster, as well as Gary's math professor whom he based his character on.
Scott C. Brown as Leo "DaVinci" Lamb/Flynn the Fine — A womanizing bard who is the only character to die in combat. Leo is the owner of the game store where the players meet.
Emily Olson as Therin, Goddess of Light — The good deity that the players serve. Olson played the foulmouthed "princess" in the first Gamers movie.
Don Early as Mort Agrippa — The first villain, governor of the village where the party tries to rest for the night.
Geoff Gibbs as Mort Kemnon — The primary villain, a necromancer who discovered the Mask of Death and planned to overthrow the king.
Ed Gibbs as Hierophant — The final villain, a high-ranking cleric who wishes to use the mask to rekindle the Light of Therin.
Tallis Moore as Drazuul — A death demon who rules the Village of Westhaven. He is tortured to death by Luster.
Chris Duppenthaler as Mark — The surviving player from The Gamers. He makes brief cameo appearances alluding to his trauma following the events of the previous film.

Style

Unlike the original movie The Gamers, multiple games companies were involved in the production process for Dorkness Rising, enabling real game products to be used in the film.  While the game being played in the first film was anonymous, in this film it is clearly stated that the group are playing Dungeons & Dragons (specifically the 3rd edition, though there is significant artistic license taken, e.g. with the characters' feats, spells and class abilities); and the adventure they are playing, The Mask Of Death, is a real adventure module published as a limited edition by Goodman Games (at the end of the movie, Lodge is seen writing up the adventure for publication).  Quotes are included from Knights of the Dinner Table, and the character Nodwick has a cameo role.

At one point the GM and female player together play a board game featuring ninjas delivering take-away pizza; it is assumed that this is an homage to Ninja Burger, which is (among other things) a card game by Steve Jackson Games which involves ninja delivering hamburgers and other fast food items. Notably, the Munchkin card game (also by SJG) appears directly in the film. In fact, the characters' inventory list includes quite a few Munchkin items, when they get back their old equipment.

There are several references (both subtle and not) to the original Gamers movie throughout. The most prominent of these is the inclusion of the character Mark from the original film (who makes a veiled reference to "the incident", and notes that people often forget he is there), and mention of the character "The Shadow". In addition, the lines "I shall smite thee with my mighty blade" as well as "And now begins the killing" come from the first film. When Lodge mentions his new villain is "The Shadow", the theme music from the first film is heard, and the characters say "The Shadow," in the same manner as in the first film. The final person to say "The Shadow" is Mark, appearing from behind a shelf in the store, immediately becoming extremely frightened and running away.

Much like the first film, Dorkness Rising makes reference to many quirks and conventions in roleplaying games and table-top gaming in general, including:
 Interplayer relationships: Several references are made to stereotypical occurrences within the group. For example, Cass often argues with Lodge regarding Rules vs. Story. There are also several instances of player versus player conflict when deciding a course of action. One example of this is when the characters encounter random NPCs: while Daphne and Osric would rather talk to them or help suffering NPCs, the rest of the players opt to kill them.
 Critical Failures: In the first film, a critical plot point occurs when a player rolls a Natural 20, which calls for an automatic success. In Dorkness Rising, two comedic occasions are based around players rolling a Natural 1, in which the character automatically fails an action. Cass tries to roll a 20 to save himself from the Death Demon and instead rolls a one, causing his character to be completely compelled to serve the demon (to the point that the DM directly controls him). When Flynn tries to back-stab Mort Kemnon's grimoire, he rolls a one and instead stabs himself. In both cases, the actions that failed were not required to be rolled by the game leader. However, the players demanded to roll to get unlikely good results, resulting in fatal mistakes.
 Player- vs. Character-Knowledge: Since Cass, Gary and Leo have played the campaign twice already, they know exactly what to do and where to go, but their new characters can't have this information. Another time they find Nodwick, the henchman of their old group, and instantly recognize him, although their new characters meet him for the first time.
 Male players playing female characters: Gary plays a scantily clad female character, Luster, whom he often forgets is female. This results in the actress portraying Luster to be replaced by Gary in a blonde wig, only to "pop back" to the actress when Gary is reminded of his character's gender.
 Weak/Redshirt characters: Leo plays a bard, a stereotypically 'weak' character class who is unable to effectively participate in any combat, as he is invariably killed by the first attack to hit him. This reaches a head when he begins to deliberately kamikaze himself to create a wall of bodies as a tactical obstacle. However, his character helps defeat the final villain at the end of the quest.
 Min-maxing: The other players view Joanna's character as weak as she does not have a strength or constitution bonus and chose questionable feats. However, Joanna proves them wrong when she almost singlehandedly wipes out a large party of goblins.
 NPCs and the Paladin's uncompromising code of honour: Lodge sends a paladin along with the group of player characters in order to fill in the spot of the fifth player. Many of the PCs' schemes thus revolve around distracting him or otherwise working around his presence. When they try to torture a demon to learn the location of the main villain, Sir Osric goes to examine the "fine, yet rustic architecture" as he is unable to stand by while torture takes place.
 Street Fighter: When coercing an enemy via torture, Luster strikes the bound man, announcing 'Hadoken!' while actually performing a 'Shoryuken'.
 Final Fantasy: During the first fight, against the goblins, the music that plays is reminiscent of the battle themes of the Final Fantasy series, as well as including the iconic 'victory fanfare'.
 Nod to Gary Gygax:  During the scene at the beginning where they are about to enter Mort Kemnon's lair (and again near the conclusion), one of them reaches to open up a door. Another stops him and points to a plaque. On the plaque is, written in a fantasy style script, "LONGLIVE GYGAX". This is a reference to the creator of D&D, Gary Gygax, who died the year this film was released. In addition, professional game designers Monte Cook and Ed Stark have cameos as Bill the cleric and the farmer who Luster kills, respectively.
 Turn-Based Combat Systems: In the encounter with the goblins, the characters all stand around in 'ready' poses until it is their turn to attack.

Sequel
In Summer of 2012, Dead Gentlemen Productions and Zombie Orpheus Entertainment held a Kickstarter for a third Gamers film, The Gamers: Hands of Fate, which is set partially at GenCon and features the same characters as Dorkness Rising.  The film's premiere was at GenCon 2013.

References

Sources

External links
Official site

An interview with Matt Vancil and Don Early

2000s American films
2000s English-language films
2008 films
2008 independent films
American adventure comedy films
American fantasy comedy films
American independent films
Films based on role-playing games
Works about fandom